Gytha Ogg (usually called Nanny Ogg) is a character from Terry Pratchett's Discworld series. She is a witch and member of the Lancre coven.

Personality 
The character of Nanny Ogg is based on the Mother stereotype of the Triple Goddess myth. Nanny Ogg has been married three times, with fifteen children who survived their early childhood, and has many grandchildren and great-grandchildren. What makes her the Mother, however, is her mentality. People go to Granny Weatherwax for help when they have no other choice, but they go to Nanny for advice all the time.

Nanny Ogg has a talent for getting along with people and fitting in. As described in Maskerade, people, after knowing her for fifteen minutes, feel as if they have known her all of their lives. Granny Weatherwax knows about this ability and recognizes its use, and wonders sometimes if it would have been worth acquiring it.

Comparison with Granny 
Nanny Ogg's wisdom is more relatable and approachable, making her more of a down-to-earth character compared to Esme Weatherwax, who may come across as aloof or unapproachable due to her immense wisdom and power. While Granny sees no point in competing if one is not going to win, Nanny believes the sympathy (and free drinks) one gets for being a good runner-up is much better. Granny comes across as judgmental, whereas Nanny is broadminded. She appears to be kinder than Granny but is equally prepared to make tough decisions if necessary. The difference has also been summarised like this: Granny Weatherwax's legendary reputation around the Ramtops can ensure cooperation. If Granny should be away from where she is known, her commanding presence is usually enough to get people to do what she says. However, in contrast, people do not mind doing things when Nanny asks them.

Contrary to Granny Weatherwax, and indeed the stereotype of witches in general, Nanny Ogg does not live in an isolated, crumbly rural cottage but in an expansive and well-looked after townhouse in the capital of Lancre (with her eldest and youngest sons living to either side), called Tir Nani Ogg ("Nanny Ogg's place", and a pun on the Tír na nÓg, the Gaelic name for the Land of the Ever-Young). People tend to "give her things" and her home is filled with knick-knacks such as pink skulls and rude garden gnomes that serve no useful purpose except to highlight her eccentricities. Her family brings back souvenirs for her whenever they go more than a few miles from home. Since she does not care whether they are cheap or not, she has several things with legends on them, such as "To The World's Greatest Mum" on them. She shares this home with Greebo, a tomcat of evil aura, aroma, and astonishing viciousness, whom she (and only she) sees as the fuzzy, harmless kitten he arguably must once have been.

In The Art of Discworld, Pratchett says, "I've always suspected that Nanny is, deep down, the most powerful of the witches, and part of her charm lies in the way she prevents people from finding this out." Indeed, incurring Nanny's wrath is suggested to be much more dangerous  of her reflexively kind personality. In Pratchett's short story "The Sea and Little Fishes" Nanny Ogg also identifies herself, and the Ogg family as a whole, as having immense natural magical talent, but as less willing to work it as hard as Weatherwaxes do.

Exploits 
Within the Discworld universe, Nanny has written several books: The Joye of Snacks, Mother Ogg's Tales For Tiny Folk and Nanny Ogg's Cookbook. The first two were withdrawn after the publisher discovered (by personal demonstration) what the dishes described in the recipes did; the third survived with heavy editing.

Nanny enjoys food and drink despite only having one remaining tooth (the sight of Nanny Ogg eating a pickled onion is described as bringing tears to the eyes). When she is drunk, she tends to sing very "special" songs, the most popular being "The Hedgehog Can Never Be Buggered At All" or simply "The Hedgehog Song" (never really unveiled by the author beyond a few lines, but many readers have written their versions). A close runner up for the most popular Nanny Ogg song is "A Wizard's Staff has a Knob on the End", a version of which has been written by Heather Wood, with music by Dave Greenslade. It is also notable that Nanny Ogg once gave Agnes Nitt lessons on how to sing, including how to sing in harmony with herself (using her alter ego, Perdita).

Nanny Ogg's bath night, as described in the novel Lords and Ladies, is an event feared by the entire population of Lancre, chiefly because she sings any of the above songs, accompanied by banjo, whilst bathing, and the tin bath amplifies her already overpowering vocal presence such that the audience is not so much "captive" as "hunted down". Residents of Lancre tend to hide their livestock at this time as well, as the trauma causes the sheep and goats to "give yogurt for weeks" afterward. This event usually occurs once a year, so everyone has plenty of time to prepare.

Nanny Ogg embarrasses Tiffany Aching, witch of the 'Chalk Steading', by talking about Roland, heir to the Baron of the Chalkland, and other romantic prospects.

Nanny Ogg is known for her romantic exploits both in her girlhood and well beyond. She has a very cheerful, practical attitude regarding sexuality and frequently offers unsolicited advice and anecdotes, though many of these are more implied than stated outright, often due to being cut short by the listener. It is noteworthy that while she had an extensive sex life as an unmarried woman and during her several periods of widowhood, she adamantly claims that she was never unfaithful to any of her husbands while married. Even in old age, she enjoys flirting and male attention, most recently from the dwarf Casanunda.

Nanny Ogg is very funny and has a tremendous laugh. She has also been credited with a grin "that should have been locked up for the sake of public decency" and her face has been described as looking like "a friendly pumpkin."

Family 
As the "matriarch" of her vast extended family, Nanny Ogg indicates the relative standing of her various descendants by positioning their portraits around her house, the "highest" being the most visible and the "lowest" of all lining Greebo's basket. However, the only people who appear truly to suffer are her daughters-in-law, of whom she has many and rules over with a tyrannical authority; Nanny lives her life exactly as she wishes, and her daughters-in-law are those who make that possible; if the floors aren't scrubbed, or her breakfast not served on time, there are consequences. Nanny never remembers their names, either. These are her only negative points.

Nanny Ogg claims, in Lords and Ladies, that her ancestors invented the ancient language of Oggham, which seems to be the Discworld equivalent of the ancient Irish runic language Ogham.

Role and power 
Nanny Ogg is far too wise and busy to carry a handbag; she keeps all she needs in her knickers, lifting her skirts to reveal a knicker leg, and extracting whatever is needed at the time. She does, however, carry a string shopping bag (also in her knickers) against emergencies, such as being presented with a loaf or a pie or a dozen buns (probably by a baker who knows that such a gift to a witch ensures reliably good baking).

In the Discworld amongst the duties of a witch is midwifery and laying out the dead. If possible, people call Nanny for the former and Granny for the latter. In effect Nanny and Granny make a perfect team with Granny doing what needs to be done and Nanny bandaging the wounded. Indeed, in Thief of Time, Nanny Ogg is sought through various timeframes as she is/will become the best midwife in the world, perhaps evinced by her statement that she has even served as midwife for entirely non-human species like Trolls.

She has an ambiguous relationship with Count Casanunda, whom she met in Genua. Nanny Ogg is also the muse and center of Leonard of Quirm's masterpiece, the Mona Ogg: her teeth follow you around the room, they say. She briefly took on Tiffany Aching as an apprentice after the death of her previous mentor, Miss Treason.

It was observed on more than one occasion, by Granny Weatherwax, that Nanny Ogg has impressive social skills. She has demonstrated the ability to socialize with all kinds of people within a very little time (Maskerade, Witches Abroad, Lords and Ladies) which sometimes leaves Granny wondering 'if Gytha has some sort of special magic'.

In the "Art of Discworld," Terry Pratchett notes that he has always believed that Nanny Ogg is the most powerful of the witches, but that she is far too clever to let it be known.

Children
Four of Nanny Ogg's many children have come to prominence within the novels so far. Other children and descendants play minor and unseen roles.

Shawn Ogg
Youngest son of Nanny Ogg. First appears in Wyrd Sisters as a guard at Lancre Castle. Since then he has become Lancre's entire standing army (except when he's lying down), as well as the civil service and most of the palace staff. According to Nanny Ogg's Cookbook, he has been granted the Order of the Lancrastian Empire. He is also notable for inventing small and almost pointless devices including the Lancrastian Army Knife which includes such attachments as "A Device for locating things that are lost" and "A Device to Remove the fundamental point from any argument".

Jason Ogg
Eldest son of Nanny Ogg, first mentioned in Wyrd Sisters. Like his father before him, he holds the office of Lancre blacksmith, which brings with it the obligation to shoe anything, and the concomitant ability to shoe anything: he has shod an ant, a unicorn, and (at regular intervals and with specially reserved metal) Death's horse Binky. He also knows the Horseman's Word, a secret to pacifying belligerent stallions he has to shoe (though, as Granny Weatherwax discovered, the "Horseman's Word" involves threats to apply a large hammer with great force to certain parts of the stallion's anatomy). Years of working with iron have also given him the ability to detect the presence or influence of elves, although he does not seem to be aware of this. He is also the leader of the Lancre Morris Men, who treat Morris dancing as something between a contact sport and a martial art.

At times, because of his large physical presence, he is called in to calm disagreements, many times simply by lifting the combatants into the air until they stop fighting. As stereotypically seen with all big men, he is something of a gentle giant (somewhat like Constable Bluejohn), and very deferring and respectful to his mother and other witches.

Shane Ogg
Nanny's grandson, Shane is a sailor and has taught her some 'basic foreign language', mostly made up of mangled European dialect. Most of the time that does not work.

Neville Ogg
Neville is a thief, although Nanny considers him not to be, as 'it's only theft if it's not an Ogg doing the stealing'. He has stolen all the lead from the Ankh-Morpork Opera House, before the events of Maskerade. Afterward, he hid out in a brothel (which Nanny thought was an ordinary hotel). When Nanny Ogg and Granny Weatherwax arrive there in Maskerade, trying to locate the publisher of her book "The Joye of Snacks" (and of course, check in on Agnes), Nanny is shocked, but Granny is on friendly terms with the Madame.

Adaptations
In the Wyrd Sisters animated adaptation, Nanny Ogg was voiced by June Whitfield. In the BBC Radio 4 adaptation of Wyrd Sisters, she was played by Lynda Baron.

Reception and legacy
Nanny Ogg, along with Rincewind, was pictured on first-class Royal Mail stamps in March 2011.

In The Art of Discworld, Pratchett mentions a fossil species of Mesozoic ginkgo known as Ginkgoites nannyoggiae.

References

Discworld witches
 Literary characters introduced in 1988
 Fictional writers